New Zealand  competed at the 2019 World Aquatics Championships in Gwangju, South Korea from 12 to 28 July.

Medalists

Artistic swimming

New Zealand entered 9 artistic swimmers.

Women

 Legend: (R) = Reserve Athlete

Diving

New Zealand entered six divers.

Men

Women

Mixed

Swimming

New Zealand entered 11 swimmers.

Men

Women

Water polo

Men's tournament

Team roster

Sid Dymond
Matthew Lewis
Rowan Brown
Ryan Pike
Nicholas Stankovich
Matthew Small (C)
Anton Sunde
Joshua Potaka
Sean Bryant
Matthew Bryant
Louis Clark
Sean Newcombe
Bae Fountain
Coach: Davor Carevic

Group C

13th–16th place semifinals

15th place game

Women's tournament

Team roster

Jessica Milicich (C)
Emily Nicholson
Bernadette Doyle
Shinae Carrington
Elizabeth Alsemgeest
Morgan Mcdowall
Emmerson Houghton
Katie McKenty
Grace Tobin
Kaitlyn Howarth
Amanda Lemon
Kate Enoka
Bridget Layburn
Coach: Angela Winstanley-Smith

Group A

Playoffs

9th–12th place semifinals

Eleventh place game

References

Nations at the 2019 World Aquatics Championships
New Zealand at the World Aquatics Championships
2019 in New Zealand sport